This is a list of defunct airlines of The Bahamas.

See also
 List of airlines of the Bahamas
 List of airports in the Bahamas

References

Bahamas
Airlines
Airlines, defunct